William Henry Armstrong Fitzpatrick Watson-Armstrong, 1st Baron Armstrong, DL, (3 May 1863 – 16 October 1941), was a British benefactor.

Born William Watson, he was born at 65 Eccleston Square, London, and educated at Eton and Trinity College, Cambridge.
His parents were John William Watson, of Adderstone Hall, Belford, Northumberland and Margaret Godman Fitzpatrick, daughter of  Patrick Persse Fitzpatrick, of Bognor Regis, Sussex. His father's parents were Sir William Henry Watson, Baron of the Exchequer, and Anne Armstrong, daughter of William Armstrong, a corn merchant and Mayor of Newcastle upon Tyne, whose son William Armstrong, 1st Baron Armstrong was the founder of the Armstrong Whitworth manufacturing empire. In 1889 William Watson assumed by royal licence the additional surname of Armstrong.

Watson-Armstrong served in the Northumberland Hussars, where he was promoted Major on 12 April 1902. He was High Sheriff of Northumberland in 1899, and was appointed a Deputy Lieutenant of Northumberland in 1901.

In 1900 he succeeded to the vast fortune of his great-uncle, Lord Armstrong. The following year he gave £100,000 (equivalent to £ in ), for the building of the new Royal Victoria Infirmary in Newcastle upon Tyne, for which the city conferred upon him the honorary Freedom in July 1901. The original 1753 infirmary buildings at Forth Banks near the river Tyne were inadequate and impossible to expand.

In September 1901 he was awarded the honorary degree of Doctor of Civil Law (DCL) from the University of Durham.

In 1903 he was raised to the peerage as Baron Armstrong, of Bamburgh and Cragside in the County of Northumberland, a revival of the barony which had become extinct on his great-uncle's death three years earlier.

Lord Armstrong was married three times. He married firstly Winifreda Jane Adye, daughter of General Sir John Miller Adye, in 1889. They had one son and one daughter. After her death in December 1914 he married secondly  Beatrice Elizabeth Cowx, daughter of Jonathan Cowx, in 1916. After her death in November 1934 he married thirdly Kathleen England (b. 12 August 1898), daughter of Reverend Charles Thorpe England, in 1935. The last two marriages were childless. Lord Armstrong died in October 1941, aged 78, and was succeeded in the barony by his only son, William. Lady Armstrong died on 2 September 1970.

References

External links

1863 births
1941 deaths
Barons Armstrong
People educated at Eton College
Alumni of Trinity College, Cambridge
Deputy Lieutenants of Northumberland
High Sheriffs of Northumberland
Northumberland Hussars officers
Peers created by Edward VII